Sam Dew is an American singer-songwriter from Chicago, Illinois. He is best known for writing the hook to the track "LoveHate Thing," a single from Wale's 2013 album The Gifted. Dew is also credited for writing and performing on additional tracks for the same album, which peaked at #1 on various Billboard charts. He has also co-written for musicians Marsha Ambrosius, Kendrick Lamar, Rihanna, Taylor Swift, Mary J. Blige, and Jessie Ware. Dew is currently signed to RCA Records and released his debut EP Damn Sue on April 7, 2015.

Career

Dew is originally from Chicago, Illinois. His music style has been compared to other singers with a wide vocal range. He played with the Atlanta-based band Cloudeater through 2013 and the release of their final album, Purge. Dew began writing music and has since penned for musicians including Marsha Ambrosius, Rihanna, Mary J. Blige, and Jessie Ware. Dew's first song of his writing career was Lotus Flower Bomb for rapper Wale. The song eventually made it to #1 on Billboards Hot R&B/Hip-Hop Song chart. Dew is also the co-writer for "Stranger", a 2014 single on Skrillex's Recess album. The song also appeared in the 2014 soundtrack for the movie Divergent.

Dew is credited for writing and performing the hook to the song LoveHate Thing, a single from the 2013 album The Gifted by rapper Wale. The song peaked at #89 on the Billboard Hot 100, as well as #30 on Billboards Hot R&B/Hip-Hop Songs and #25 on Billboards Rhythmic chart. The song was also nominated for a 2013 Soul Train Music Award for best collaboration. One of his most notable collaborations came in December 2014 with the release of Shell Shock, a collaboration with Dave Sitek and vocalist Alice Smith in reaction to the death of Eric Garner.

In 2015 Dew signed with RCA Records He wrote the hook for Wale's 2015 song The Matrimony, performed by Usher. He also wrote and sings the hook on UK producer Julio Bashmore's track "Holding On." His debut EP, titled Damn Sue, was produced by TV on the Radio member Dave Sitek and was released in April 2015. That same year he contributed vocals on the Prefuse 73 EP Forsyth Gardens.

In 2017, Dew co-wrote the Taylor Swift and Zayn single "I Don't Wanna Live Forever" with Swift and Jack Antonoff. In August 2017 Sam released singles Runner" and "Remember".

In 2019, Dew collaborated with Jack Antonoff and Sounwave to produce the self-titled album "Red Hearse".

On February 26, 2021, Dew released his debut album Moonlit Fools.

Dew was featured in Kendrick Lamar's 2022 album Mr. Morale & The Big Steppers, worked with Swift on her album Midnights, and worked with Joji on his album Smithereens.

Discography

Album
 Moonlit Fools (2021)

Extended plays

Singles

References

External links
 Sam Dew official website

Living people
Musicians from Chicago
RCA Records artists
Roc Nation artists
American hip hop singers
Year of birth missing (living people)